Epping is a city in Williams County, North Dakota, United States. The population was 84 at the 2020 census.

Epping was founded in 1905 along the transcontinental rail line of the Great Northern Railway. The name comes from the city of Epping in England.

Geography
Epping is located at  (48.280762, -103.358139).

Demographics

2010 census
As of the census of 2010, there were 100 people, 37 households, and 27 families residing in the city. The racial makeup of the city was 81.0% White, 11.0% Native American, 5.0% Asian, and 3.0% from two or more races.

There were 37 households, of which 37.8% had children under the age of 18 living with them, 67.6% were married couples living together, 2.7% had a female householder with no husband present, 2.7% had a male householder with no wife present, and 27.0% were non-families. 24.3% of all households were made up of individuals, and 5.4% had someone living alone who was 65 years of age or older. The average household size was 2.70 and the average family size was 3.26.

The median age in the city was 39.5 years. 31% of residents were under the age of 18; 4% were between the ages of 18 and 24; 20% were from 25 to 44; 33% were from 45 to 64; and 12% were 65 years of age or older. The gender makeup of the city was 49.0% male and 51.0% female.

2000 census
As of the census of 2000, there were 79 people, 33 households, and 23 families residing in the city. The population density was 207.7 people per square mile (80.3/km2). There were 41 housing units at an average density of 107.8 per square mile (41.7/km2). The racial makeup of the city was 94.94% White and 5.06% Native American.

There were 33 households, out of which 30.3% had children under the age of 18 living with them, 63.6% were married couples living together, 3.0% had a female householder with no husband present, and 30.3% were non-families. 27.3% of all households were made up of individuals, and 12.1% had someone living alone who was 65 years of age or older. The average household size was 2.39 and the average family size was 2.96.

In the city, the population was spread out, with 22.8% under the age of 18, 6.3% from 18 to 24, 25.3% from 25 to 44, 34.2% from 45 to 64, and 11.4% who were 65 years of age or older. The median age was 43 years. For every 100 females, there were 102.6 males. For every 100 females age 18 and over, there were 103.3 males.

The median income for a household in the city was $29,167, and the median income for a family was $33,125. Males had a median income of $28,542 versus $23,125 for females. The per capita income for the city was $14,167. There were 19.0% of families and 22.7% of the population living below the poverty line, including 38.1% of under eighteens and none of those over 64.

Education
It is within the Nesson School District (Ray Public School).

Climate
According to the Köppen Climate Classification system, Epping has a semi-arid climate, abbreviated "BSk" on climate maps.

References

Cities in North Dakota
Cities in Williams County, North Dakota
Populated places established in 1905
1905 establishments in North Dakota